Fan Jinshi (born July 1938) is a Chinese archaeologist and heritage specialist who served as director of the Dunhuang Research Academy between 1998 and 2014. She spends most of her life in Mogao Caves, Dunhuang, currently working as an honorary president and professional researcher in Dunhuang Research Academy, as well as a part-time professor and a doctoral supervisor in Lanzhou University. Fan began working in Dunhuang in 1963, at the age of 25. She has been venerated as "Daughter of Dunhuang" for her over 50 years of devotion to studying and preserving the Dunhuang Grottoes. She was an early proponent of the Dunhuang Academy in contemporary China, and pioneered a series of effective preservation approaches for grottos.

She was a delegate to the 13th National Congress of the Communist Party of China. She was a member of the 8th, 9th and 10th National Committee of the Chinese People's Political Consultative Conference.

Biography

Early life 
Fan was born in Beijing and was raised in Shanghai. Her ancestral home is in Hangzhou, Zhejiang. Her given name, Jinshi, means "beautiful poetry" in Chinese. Her father was a graduate of Tsinghua University and was reportedly passionate about Chinese classical art and culture, a passion he passed on to Fan.

Education 
Fan Jinshi graduated from School of Archaeology and Museology(previously under the Department of History) in Peking University in 1963. Fan first visited Dunhuang in 1962, on a school-organized trip to the Dunhuang Institute of Cultural Relics (now Dunhuang Academy). Su Bai, a veteran archaeologist at Peking University, was reportedly an instructor and mentor to her during her time at university.

Career 
After graduation, she was dispatched to Dunhuang, where she worked in the Dunhuang Institute of Cultural Relics (now Dunhuang Research Academy). At the time of her arrival, the academy's headquarters was not a comfortable place to live and did not have electricity or running water. 

In August 1984 she became deputy director of the Dunhuang Research Academy, rising to Director in April 1998, after 35 years of service at the institute. In January 2015 she became the honorary director. She also served as a part-time professor and doctoral supervisor at the Lanzhou University.

She is also a prominent advocate of the Digital Dunhuang project, which allows the global public to visit the Mogao Caves online.

According to colleagues, Fan reportedly once said that her greatest wish is to recover the Dunhuang manuscripts lost abroad and house them in a museum at Dunhuang.

Personal life
Fan married her university classmate Peng Jinzhang (1937–2017) in 1966. He was also an archaeologist. Reportedly, as Fan's flourishing career kept the couple apart, Peng resigned his position as Deputy Director in the Department of History at Wuhan University in 1986 in order to live closer to her.  Fan has been quoted as saying that "...[my husband] knew that I couldn't live without Dunhuang. He made sacrifices." The couple has a son.

Works
 Fan Jinshi et al (2002). The Regulations for the Conservation of the Mogao Caves in Dunhuang, Gansu Province. 
 
 
 
 
 
 
 
 
 Fan Jinshi, ed., et al. The Complete Collection of Dunhuang Grottoes.

Honors 

 Fan has received the national honor of "Outstanding Contributor to the Cultural Heritage Preservation" for her substantial contribution to the permanent preservation and sustainable utilization of the Mogao Grottoes in Dunhuang. 
 Fan has been awarded the honorary title of "National Advanced Laborer". 
 In 2008, Fan was honored as one of the ten distinguished alumni of Peking University. 
 In 2018, Fan was awarded the title of "Reform Pioneer".

Representation in Media

Opera 
Fan was the subject of a Shanghai Huju opera called "The Daughter of Dunhuang".

Variety Shows

References

1938 births
Living people
Peking University alumni
Academic staff of Lanzhou University
Chinese women archaeologists
Scientists from Beijing
Dunhuang